A cornet is a brass instrument that closely resembles the trumpet.

Cornet or Kornet may also refer to:

Military
 Cornet (rank), a commissioned officer rank in cavalry troops, once the bearer of the Troop's flag or Cornet
 9M133 Kornet, a Russian anti-tank guided missile
 Fähnrich, an Austrian and German officer candidate rank since 1899, previously a Cornet (who carried the cornet/flag) c. 1480 in Germany

Name
 Alizé Cornet (born 1990), female tennis player from France
 Gnaly Albert Maxwel Cornet (born 1996), professional footballer from Ivory Coast
 Peeter Cornet (ca. 1570-80–1633), Dutch composer of the early 17th century

Places

Romania
 Cornet, a village in Brusturi, Bihor County
 Cornet, a village in Poduri, Bacău County
 Cornet, a village in Vaideeni, Vâlcea County
 Cornet, a tributary of the Bucureșci in Hunedoara County
 Cornet, a tributary of the Holod in Bihor County
 Cornet, a tributary of the Sălătrucel in Vâlcea County

Elsewhere
 Cornet, Washington, a community in the United States
 Cornet Bay, a bay in the U.S. state of Washington
 Castle Cornet, a castle on an island (Cornet Rock) close to Guernsey
 The Cornet, a peak in the South Shetland Islands of Antarctica

Other
 Cornet (hat): hennin 
 Cornet (hat component): lappet
 Cornetfish
 Cornet (organ stop) (pronounced "cornay"), a composite stop on an organ consisting of the 8', 4', 2-2/3', 2', and 1-3/5' stops
 Cornet, a British English synonym for ice cream cone
 The main character in the PlayStation video game Rhapsody: A Musical Adventure
 Kornet, a potato snack food in the Philippines produced by Granny Goose
Cornet River (disambiguation)
Cornet (sculpture), a 1984 outdoor concrete and steel sculpture by David Adickes
The Cornet (film), a 1955 West German film

See also
Cornette, a kind of medieval headgear
Cornett (disambiguation)
Coronet (disambiguation)